Amanita persicina, commonly known as the peach-colored fly agaric, is a basidiomycete fungus of the genus Amanita. This fungus was previously believed to be a variety of Amanita muscaria, but research has recently shown that Amanita persicina is best treated as a distinct species.

Amanita persicina is distinguished by its peach-colored center and its eastern North American distribution.

Taxonomy
Amanita persicina was formerly treated as a variety of Amanita muscaria (commonly known as the fly agaric) and it was classified as A. muscaria var. persicina. Recent DNA evidence, however, has indicated that Amanita persicina is better treated as a distinct species, and it was elevated to species status in 2015 by Tulloss & Geml.

Description
Amanita persicina has a pleasant taste and odor.  It is both psychoactive and poisonous if not properly prepared by parboiling. It should not be eaten without further research.

Cap
The cap is 4–13 cm wide, hemispheric to convex when young, becoming plano-convex to plano-depressed in age. It is pinkish-melon-colored to peach-orange, sometimes pastel red towards the disc. The cap is slightly appendiculate. The volva is distributed over the cap as thin pale yellowish to pale tannish warts; it is otherwise smooth and subviscid, and the margin becomes slightly to moderately striate in age. The flesh is white and does not stain when cut or injured.

Gills
The gills are free, crowded, moderately broad, creamy with a pale pinkish tint, and have a very floccose edge. They are abruptly truncate.

Spores
Amanita persicina spores are white in deposit, ellipsoid to elongate, infrequently broadly ellipsoid, rarely cylindric, inamyloid, and are (8.0) 9.4–12.7 (18.0) x (5.5) 6.5–8.5 (11.1) µm.

Stipe
The stipe is 4–10.5 cm long, 1–2 cm wide, and more or less equal or narrowing upwards and slightly flaring at the apex. It is pale yellow in the superior region, tannish white below, and densely stuffed with a pith; the ring is fragile, white above and yellowish below, and poorly formed or absent. Remnants of the universal veil on the vasal bulb as concentric rings are fragile or absent.

Distribution and habitat
Amanita persicina is found growing solitary or gregariously. It is mycorrhizal with conifers (Pine) and deciduous (Oak) trees in North America. It often fruits in the fall, but sometimes in the spring and summer in the southern states. The fungus is common in the southeast United States, from Texas to Georgia, and north to New Jersey.

Biochemistry
This species contains variable amounts of the neurotoxic compounds ibotenic acid and muscimol.

Gallery

References

Miller, O. K. Jr., D. T. Jenkins and P. Dery. 1986. Mycorrhizal synthesis of Amanita muscaria var. persicina with hard pines. Mycotaxon 26: 165–172.
Jenkins, D. T.  1977. A taxonomic and nomenclatural study of the genus Amanita section Amanita for North America.  Biblioth. Mycol. 57: 126 pp.

External links
Amanita persicina page by Rod Tulloss

persicina
Fungi described in 1977